Leshnitsa or Lešnica refers to the following places:

Bulgaria
 Leshnitsa, Blagoevgrad Province, a settlement in Blagoevgrad Province
 Leshnitsa, Lovech Province, a settlement in Lovech Province

North Macedonia
 Lešnica, Gostivar, a settlement in Gostivar Municipality
 Lešnica, Kičevo, a settlement in Kičevo Municipality

Serbia
Lešnica, Serbia, a settlement in the Loznica Municipality

Slovenia
Lešnica, Ormož, a settlement in Ormož Municipality
Lešnica, Novo Mesto, a settlement in Novo Mesto Municipality
Lešnica (Stoganka), a creek in Upper Carniola, a tributary of Stoganka Creek
Lešnica (Drava), a creek in Styria, a tributary of the Drava River
Lešnica (Krka), a creek in Lower Carniola, a tributary of the Krka River

See also
Lesnica (disambiguation)
Lješnica (disambiguation)